Cyclargus ammon, known generally as the nickerbean blue or Lucas' blue, is a species of blue in the butterfly family Lycaenidae. It is found in the Caribbean Sea and North America.

The MONA or Hodges number for Cyclargus ammon is 4358.1.

References

Further reading

External links

 

Cyclargus
Articles created by Qbugbot